Jack Dempsey (1878 – 10 December 1913) was an Irish Gaelic footballer. His championship career at senior level with the Dublin county team lasted six seasons from 1902 until 1907.

In spite of being a native of Wexford, Dempsey enjoyed his greatest club success as a member of the Bray Emmets club. He won his sole county senior championship medal in 1901.

Dempsey made his debut on the inter-county scene as a member of the Dublin senior football team during the 1902 championship. Over the course of the next six seasons, he won three All-Ireland medals, beginning with a lone victory as captain of the team in 1902, followed by back-to-back championships in 1906 and 1907. Demspey also won four Leinster medals.

Dempsey died from tuberculosis on 10 December 1913.

Honours

Bray Emmets
Dublin Senior Football Championship (1): 1901

Dublin
All-Ireland Senior Football Championship (3): 1902 (c), 1906, 1907
Leinster Senior Football Championship (4): 1902 (c), 1904, 1906, 1907

References

1878 births
1913 deaths
Dublin inter-county Gaelic footballers
Tuberculosis deaths in Ireland
20th-century deaths from tuberculosis